Harihar Patel (20 September 1924 – 1991) was an Indian politician. He was a Member of Parliament, representing Odisha in the Rajya Sabha, the upper house of India's Parliament as a member of the Ganatantra Parishad. Patel died in 1991.

References

1924 births
1991 deaths
Rajya Sabha members from Odisha